Macarena Alonso (born 13 January 1993) is an Argentinian team handball player. She plays for the club Sedalo, and on the Argentine national team. She represented Argentina at the 2013 World Women's Handball Championship in Serbia.

References

Argentine female handball players
1993 births
Living people
20th-century Argentine women
21st-century Argentine women